There You Go Again is the twenty-fourth studio album by Kenny Rogers, released in 2000. It is his second studio album on his own Dreamcatcher Records label. It produced the singles "There You Go Again", "He Will, She Knows", "Homeland" and "Beautiful (All That You Could Be)".

Track listing

Personnel 

 Kenny Rogers – lead vocals
 Warren Hartman – synthesizers (1, 3, 10, 12)
 Bobby Ogdin – keyboards (1, 2, 3, 5, 6), acoustic piano (1, 2, 4, 10, 12), Hammond B3 organ (2, 4, 11), Wurlitzer electric piano (11)
 Gary Smith – keyboards (7, 9)
 Richard Marx – backing vocals (7, 9), keyboards (9)
 Pat Bergeson – electric guitar (1, 2, 3, 5, 6, 8, 10), acoustic guitar (2, 5, 6), harmonica (8)
 Mark Selby – acoustic guitar (1, 3, 4, 11, 12)
 Dan Dugmore – steel guitar (1-5, 10, 11, 12), pedal steel guitar (4)
 Michael Spriggs – acoustic guitar (2, 10)
 Jonathan Yudkin – mandolin (2), violin (10, 12)
 J.T. Corenflos – electric guitar (4, 7, 9, 11, 12)
 Stuart Duncan – mandolin (4, 11)
 Russ Pahl – steel guitar (6)
 Bruce Gaitsch – acoustic guitar (7, 9)
 Paul Franklin – steel guitar (7, 9)
 Mark Casstevens – acoustic guitar (8)
 Steve Wariner – electric guitar (8), backing vocals (8)
 Duane Eddy – electric guitar (11)
 David Hungate – bass guitar (1, 3)
 Glenn Worf – bass guitar (2, 10)
 Spencer Campbell – bass guitar (4, 11, 12)
 Viktor Krauss – bass guitar (5, 6)
 Michael Rhodes – bass guitar (7, 9)
 Larry Paxton – bass guitar (8)
 Shannon Forrest – drums (1, 3, 8)
 Eddie Bayers – drums (4, 7, 9-12)
 Wayne Killius – percussion (1)
 Paul Leim – percussion (2, 5, 6), drums (5, 6)
 Brent Maher – percussion (11)
 Larry Franklin – fiddle (8)
 Kirk "Jelly Roll" Johnson – harmonica (11)
 Suzy Bogguss – backing vocals (1)
 Billy Dean – backing vocals (1)
 Gene Johnson – backing vocals (2)
 Collin Raye – backing vocals (2)
 Marty Roe – backing vocals (2)
 Dana Williams – backing vocals (2)
 Alison Krauss – backing vocals (3)
 John Cowan – backing vocals (4)
 Thom Flora – backing vocals (4, 6)
 Jack Sundrud – backing vocals (4)
 Linda Davis – backing vocals (5, 7)
 Chip Davis – backing vocals (6)
 Tammy Pierce – backing vocals (6)
 Dennis Wilson – backing vocals (6)
 Steve Glassmeyer – backing vocals (7)
 Gene Sisk – backing vocals (7)
 Rodney Covington – group vocals (8)
 Everett Drake – group vocals (8)
 Edward Jenkins – group vocals (8)
 Rev. Lawrence Thomison – group vocals (8)
 Brad Paisley – backing vocals (10)

Production
 Producers – Kenny Rogers (Tracks 1, 2, 3, 5, 6, 8 & 10); Jim McKell (Tracks 1-6, 8, 10 & 12); Brent Maher (Tracks 4, 11 & 12); Richard Marx (Tracks 7 & 9).
 Production Coordinator on Tracks 4, 11 & 12 – Jan Greenfield 
 Engineers – Jim McKell (Tracks 1-6, 8, 10 & 12); Brent Maher (Tracks 4, 11 & 12); David Cole (Tracks 7 & 9).
 Additional Engineers – Dave Egan, Frank Green, Mills Logan and Sylvian Phillipon.
 Assistant Engineers – Drew Bollman, Jason Breckling, Aaron Freedman, Bob Horn, Mark Lacuesta, Melissa Mattey, Bobby Morse, Chris Scherbak, Phillip Scoggins, Paul Skaife, Joshua Wallace and Matt Weeks.
 Mixing – Jim McKell (Tracks 1-8, 10, 11 & 12); Brent Maher (Tracks 4, 11 & 12); David Cole (Track 9).
 Mastered by Jim McKell and Frank Green
 Management – Ken Kragen and Jim Mazza at Dreamcatcher Artist Management.

Studios
 Recorded at Seventeen Grand Recording, Creative Recording Inc., Emerald Sound Studio, Masterlink Studio, Morraine Recording, OmniSound Studios and Quad Studios Nashville (Nashville, Tennessee); The Sound Kitchen (Franklin, Tennessee).
 Mixed at LaMaison and Morraine Recording (Nashville, Tennessee); The Sound Kitchen (Franklin, Tennessee); The Village Recorder (Los Angeles, California).
 Mastered at Digital Editing & Mastering (Nashville, Tennessee).

Chart performance

References

Kenny Rogers albums
2000 albums
Albums produced by Richard Marx
Albums produced by Brent Maher